{{safesubst:#invoke:RfD||2=Kristen Cui|month = February
|day = 22
|year = 2023
|time = 01:25
|timestamp = 20230222012506

|content=
redirect Knock at the Cabin

}}